The 2017 African Women's Handball Cup Winners' Cup was the 33rd edition, organized by the African Handball Confederation, under the auspices of the International Handball Federation, the handball sport governing body. The tournament was held from April 13–22, 2017 in one venue: the Salle Omnisport Al Inbiâat, in Agadir, Morocco, contested by 7 teams and won by 1º de Agosto of Angola thus successfully defending its title.

Teams

Schedule & results

Times given below are in WEST UTC+1.

Final standings

See also 
2017 African Women's Handball Champions League

References

External links 
 Tournament profile at goalzz.com
 

African Women's Handball Cup Winner's Cup
2017 in African handball
2017 in Moroccan sport